In mathematics, the classifying space for the unitary group U(n) is a space BU(n) together with a universal bundle EU(n) such that any hermitian bundle on a paracompact space X is the pull-back of EU(n) by a map X → BU(n) unique up to homotopy.

This space with its universal fibration may be constructed as either
 the Grassmannian of n-planes in an infinite-dimensional complex Hilbert space; or,
 the direct limit, with the induced topology, of Grassmannians of n planes.
Both constructions are detailed here.

Construction as an infinite Grassmannian
The total space EU(n) of the universal bundle is given by

The symbol  is the inner product on H.  Thus, we have that EU(n) is the space of orthonormal n-frames in H.

The group action of U(n) on this space is the natural one. The base space is then

and is the set of Grassmannian n-dimensional subspaces (or n-planes) in H. That is,

so that V is an n-dimensional vector space.

Case of line bundles 
For n = 1, one has EU(1) = S∞, which is known to be a contractible space. The base space is then BU(1) = CP∞, the infinite-dimensional complex projective space.  Thus, the set of isomorphism classes of circle bundles over a manifold M are in one-to-one correspondence with the homotopy classes of maps from M to CP∞.

One also has the relation that

that is, BU(1) is the infinite-dimensional projective unitary group. See that article for additional discussion and properties.

For a torus T, which is abstractly isomorphic to U(1) × ... × U(1), but need not have a chosen identification, one writes BT.

The topological K-theory K0(BT) is given by numerical polynomials; more details below.

Construction as an inductive limit
Let Fn(Ck) be the space of orthonormal families of n vectors in Ck and let Gn(Ck) be the Grassmannian of n-dimensional subvector spaces of Ck. The total space of the universal bundle can be taken to be the direct limit of the Fn(Ck) as k → ∞, while the base space is the direct limit of the Gn(Ck) as k → ∞.

Validity of the construction
In this section, we will define the topology on EU(n) and prove that EU(n) is indeed contractible.

The group U(n) acts freely on Fn(Ck) and the quotient is the Grassmannian Gn(Ck). The map

 

is a fibre bundle of fibre Fn−1(Ck−1). Thus because  is trivial and because of the long exact sequence of the fibration, we have

 

whenever .

 

This last group is trivial for k > n + p. Let

 

be the direct limit of all the Fn(Ck) (with the induced topology). Let

 

be the direct limit of all the Gn(Ck) (with the induced topology).

Lemma: The group  is trivial for all p ≥ 1.

Proof: Let γ : Sp → EU(n), since Sp is compact, there exists k such that γ(Sp) is included in Fn(Ck). By taking k big enough, we see that γ is homotopic, with respect to the base point, to the constant map.

In addition, U(n) acts freely on EU(n). The spaces Fn(Ck) and Gn(Ck) are CW-complexes. One can find a decomposition of these spaces into CW-complexes such that the decomposition of Fn(Ck), resp. Gn(Ck), is induced by restriction of the one for Fn(Ck+1), resp. Gn(Ck+1). Thus EU(n) (and also Gn(C∞)) is a CW-complex. By Whitehead Theorem and the above Lemma, EU(n) is contractible.

Cohomology of BU(n)
 Proposition: The cohomology of the classifying space H*(BU(n)) is a ring of polynomials in n variables
c1, ..., cn where cp is of degree 2p.

Proof: Let us first consider the case n = 1. In this case, U(1) is the circle S1 and the universal bundle is S∞ → CP∞. This proves the Proposition for n = 1.

There are homotopy fiber sequences

 

Applying the Gysin sequence, one has a long exact sequence

 

where  is the fundamental class of the fiber . It follows that  must always be surjective: by the universal property of polynomial rings, a choice of preimage for each generator induces a multiplicative splitting. Hence, by exactness,  must always be injective. We therefore have short exact sequences split by a ring homomorphism

 

Thus we conclude  where . This completes the induction.

K-theory of BU(n)

Consider topological complex K-theory as the cohomology theory represented by the spectrum . In this description, the product structure on  comes from the H-space structure of  given by Whitney sum of vector bundles. This product is called the Pontryagin product.

The topological K-theory is known explicitly in terms of numerical symmetric polynomials.

The K-theory reduces to computing K0, since K-theory is 2-periodic by the Bott periodicity theorem, and BU(n) is a limit of complex manifolds, so it has a CW-structure with only cells in even dimensions, so odd K-theory vanishes.

Thus , where , where t is the Bott generator.

K0(BU(1)) is the ring of numerical polynomials in w, regarded as a subring of H∗(BU(1); Q) = Q[w], where w is element dual to tautological bundle.

For the n-torus, K0(BTn) is numerical polynomials in n variables. The map K0(BTn) → K0(BU(n)) is onto, via a splitting principle, as Tn is the maximal torus of U(n). The map is the symmetrization map

and the image can be identified as the symmetric polynomials satisfying the integrality condition that

where

is the multinomial coefficient and  contains r distinct integers, repeated  times, respectively.

See also
 Classifying space for O(n)
 Topological K-theory
 Atiyah–Jänich theorem

Notes

References
 Explicit description of 

Homotopy theory